Óscar Darío Londoño Montoya (born 3 March 1979) is a retired Colombian football forward.

Career
Born in Medellín, Londoño began playing football with Atlético Nacional in Colombia's Categoría Primera A. He has also played for Categoría Primera A sides Cortuluá, Santa Fe, Atlético Huila and Atlético Bucaramanga, and had a brief spell in Panama with Árabe Unido.

Titles

References

1979 births
Living people
Colombian footballers
Footballers from Medellín
Atlético Nacional footballers
Cortuluá footballers
Independiente Santa Fe footballers
Atlético Huila footballers
Atlético Bucaramanga footballers
La Equidad footballers
Bogotá FC footballers
Águilas Doradas Rionegro players
C.D. Árabe Unido players
Academia F.C. players
Fortaleza C.E.I.F. footballers
Categoría Primera A players
Categoría Primera B players
Colombian expatriate footballers
Expatriate footballers in Panama
Association football forwards